Jaroslav Hilbert (19 January 1871 in Louny – 10 May 1936 in Prague) was a Czech dramatist and writer. His most famous works include Guilt (1896), the Pariahs (1900), Falkenstein (1903), and Nest in the storm (1919).

External links

Works

20th-century Czech dramatists and playwrights
Czech male dramatists and playwrights
1871 births
1936 deaths
People from Louny